Joep Franssens (born 13 January 1955) is a Dutch composer.

Work
Joep Franssens studied piano in Groningen and composition in the Hague and Rotterdam with composer Louis Andriessen and Klaas de Vries respectively. Franssens is a representative of the post-serial generation of Dutch composers who use tonal means and an accessible idiom without neo-Romantic features, even if the pathos-laden, highly emotional nature of his music appears to contradict this endeavour. In his works, which consist of chamber music, choral and orchestral works, Franssens aims at a synthesis of monumentality and euphony and is initially guided by J.S. Bach and the work of György Ligeti such as Lontano and Atmosphères. Later a trend towards radical austerity become apparent under the influence of American minimalist music, East European mysticism (e.g. Pärt) and the symphonic pop music of the 1970s such as Yes and Genesis, culminating in the static diatonicism of the ensemble work ‘Dwaallicht’ (1989) and the serene counterpoint of ‘Sanctus’ for orchestra (1996, rev. 1999). The instrumentation increasingly shows a preference for warm, luxuriant colours.

Although Franssens' multifaceted musical style does not make it easy to classify him, he is often regarded as a representative of the so-called New Spirituality in the Netherlands. NTR (Dutch public Television) made the documentary 'The Third Ear' on this international movement, with composers such as Arvo Pärt and Giya Kancheli. In his music Franssens aims to express the Universal; his sources of inspiration are to be found amongst writers and philosophers like Fernando Pessoa and Baruch de Spinoza. In a rich tonal language his music evokes strong emotions by the public, both unacquainted with contemporary classical music as well as experienced listeners.

Franssens' choral work Harmony of the Spheres has been performed globally. He worked with choirs such as the Swedish Radio Choir, BBC Singers, Latvian National State Choir, Finnish Radio Chamber Choir and Netherlands Chamber Choir. The latter took Franssens’ music on tour through Europe and the USA in 2000 and 2001, led by the Estonian conductor Tõnu Kaljuste. Multi-laureate pianist Ralph van Raat has his music on his repertoire since 2000. His orchestral music is performed by many Dutch orchestras.

Well-known conductors like Yakov Kreizberg, Tõnu Kaljuste, Lucas Foss, Gerd Albrecht, Vasily Petrenko, and Daniel Raiskin performed his works with the Netherlands Philharmonic Orchestra, the Rotterdam Philharmonic Orchestra, The Hague Philharmonic Orchestra, Lodz Philharmonic Orchestra, Latvian National State Orchestra, Netherlands Radio Philharmonic Orchestra and Tallinn Chamber Orchestra.

Franssens received commissions from, amongst others, Rotterdam Art Foundation, Eduard van Beinum Foundation, De Doelen, NTR ZaterdagMatinee, Fund for the Creation of the Arts, SNS Reaal Fund and Netherlands Symphony Orchestra. The latter performed the world premiere of Bridge of Dawn (Second Movement) in Spring 2013.

On the occasion of the 80th birthday of Arvo Pärt in November 2015, the first performance of his Piano Concerto took place with soloist Ralph Van Raat accompanied by the Noord Nederlands Orkest conducted by Tõnu Kaljuste. Just prior to the premiere, Franssens was awarded ‘Het Gouden Viooltje’ (The Golden Violin).  An award earmarked for outstanding musical talent, born in the northern Dutch provinces, with an international career.

Compositions

 Between the Beats (1979) for two pianos
 August Moon (1979) for piano 
 Turn (1980) for 2 oboes and cello
 Solo for Flute (1980)
 Ellipsis (1983) for harpsichord
 Echo's (1983) for 4 flutes, 3 oboes, 3 trumpets, vibraphone, marimba and strings (7.7.7.4.2)
 Consort Music (1984) for 2 flutes, oboe (English horn), bass clarinet, French horn, bassoon, violin, viola, cello, double bass and piano
 Phasing (1985) for women's choir and orchestra: text (Portuguese) by Fernando Pessoa
 Low Budget Music (1986) for flute, oboe (English horn), clarinet (bass clarinet), French horn, bassoon, piano, violin, viola, cello and double bass
 Old Songs, New Songs (1988) for 2 pianos
 Dwaallicht (1989) for 2 sopranos and ensemble: text (Latin) by Spinoza
 Floating (1989) for 2 vibraphones and 3 marimbas
 Taking the Waters (1990) for solo soprano and orchestra
 The straight Line (1991) for saxophone quartet
 Primary Colours (1992) for saxophone orchestra
 The Gift of Song (1994) for 2 pianos
 New Departure (1995) for cello and piano
 After the Queen's Speech (1995) for brass ensemble
 Sanctus (1996) for orchestra
 Winter Child (1996) for piano
 Sarum Chant (1997) for vocal quartet and gamelan
 Roaring Rotterdam (1997) for orchestra
 Entrata (1997) for cello and 2 pianos
 Magnificat (1999) for soprano, choir and orchestra: text (Portuguese) by Fernando Pessoa
 Harmony of the Spheres (1994-2001); cycle in five movements for mixed chorus and string orchestra
 Intimation of Spring (2001-2004) for piano
 Tales of Wonder (2003); seven pieces for piano (2-4 hands)
 Bridge of Dawn, movement 1 (2004-2006) for orchestra
 Harmony of the Spheres, movement 5 (2005); version for flute orchestra
 Song of Release (2005) for piano
 Blue Encounter (2006) for viola
 Grace (2008) for orchestra
 Bridge of Dawn, movement 2 (2005-2011) for soprano, mixed choir and orchestra
 Harmony of the Spheres, first movement (2012) version for string orchestra
 Harmony of the Spheres, fifth movement (2013) version for string orchestra
 Symmetry (2014), a dance-opera film
 Piano Concerto (2015)
 Piano Concerto (2016) version for chamber orchestra
 Taking the Waters (2016) version for 4 pianos
 Entrata (2016) version for 4 pianos

Publisher
Franssens' music was published by Donemus in Amsterdam. Since 2008 his music is published by Deuss Music (managed by Albersen Verhuur) in The Hague.

Compact discs
 Echo's, Phasing, Sanctus. Performed by the Netherlands Ballet Orchestra, conductor Thierry Fischer. Label: Composers’ Voice (CV 65)
 Dwaallicht, Taking the Waters and Winter Child. Performed by Gerrie de Vries, Reina Boelens, Delta Ensemble, Netherlands Radio Philhar- monic Orch. Lukas Foss, Ivo Janssen. Label: Composers’ Voice (CV 84)
 Harmony of the Spheres, complete cycle Performed by The Chamber Choir of the Netherlands with Tallinn Chamber Orchestra conducted by Tõnu Kaljuste. Label: Composers Voice (CV 133)
 Harmony of the Spheres, complete cycle version 2010. Performed by VU Chamber Choir and Ensemble Waterloo, conductor Boudewijn Jansen, published bij Franssens 2011,
 The Straight Line. Performed by the Amstel Saxophone Quartet. Label: Erasmus Music & Media WVH 269
 Roaring Rotterdam, Harmony of the Spheres (first movement) and Magnificat. Performed by the Netherlands Radio Philharmonic Orchestra, Netherlands Radio Choir and Netherlands Chamber Choir. Label: Etcetera (ktc 1321)
 Entrata, Old Songs New Songs, Between The Beats. Minimal Piano Collection, Vol. XI-XX Performed by pianist Jeroen van Veen and others. Label: Brilliant Classics (9171)
 Piano Works: The Gift of Song, Winter Child. Ralph van Raat (piano) Label: :nl:Etcetera Records, KTC 1533

References

 1997 Sound, Johan Kolsteeg PhD, 'Key Notes' XXXI/I-1997, p 20-23;
 1999 Affirmation and restraint: Relationships between concepts of spirituality and music in the works of Joep Franssens and Daan Manneke, Prof.dr. R. de Groot (University Amsterdam) in BRIEF (Privacies), ASCA Yearbook 1999 (2000), p. 107-129.
 2009 The Third Ear, documentary on Joep Franssens, a.o. Produced by Viewpoint Productions and NPO (Dutch Public Television);
 2010  Joep Franssens Harmony of the Spheres, A Conductor's Analysis, Dr. David Andrew Hobson, Louisiana State University, USA December 2010;
 2015 Musical Religiosity, (Tilburg University), 'Temenos' (Nordic Journal of Comparative Religion), Vol. 51, no 1, 2015, p.123 - 136;
 2015 Piano Concerto by Ralph van Raat, interview - mini- documentary on with English subtitle YouTube;
 2015 Gouden Viooltje voor componist Joep Franssens, Dagblad van het Noorden, Groningen 30 October 2015;
 2016 Joep Franssens, catalogue, DEUSS Music (managed by Albersen Verhuur), The Hague, July 2016;

External links
 Website Joep Franssens This website shows under 'media' a complete list of all sources/references/books and published interviews.

Dutch composers
1955 births
People from Groningen (city)
Living people